Nucras boulengeri, also known commonly as the Uganda savannah lizard and Boulenger's scrub lizard, is a species of lizard in the family Lacertidae ("wall lizards" or "true lizards"). The species is native to East Africa.

Etymology
The specific name, boulengeri, is in honor of Belgian-born British herpetologist George Albert Boulenger.

Geographic range
N. boulengeri is found in Kenya, Tanzania, Uganda, and Zambia.

Habitat
The preferred natural habitats of N. boulengeri are shrubland, savanna, and forest.

Description

Reproduction
N. boulengeri is oviparous.

References

Further reading
Boulenger GA (1907). "Descriptions of new Lizards in the British Museum". Annals and Magazine of Natural History, Seventh Series 19: 486–489. (Nucras emini, new species, p. 488).
Müller J (1998). "Zur besseren Kenntnis von Nucras boulengeri (NEUMANN, 1900), einer wenig bekannten Eidechse aus Ostafrika". Die Eidechse 8 (3): 88–96. (in German).
Neumann O (1900). "Description of a new Lizard of the Genus Nucras from Usoga, British East Africa". Ann. Mag. Nat. Hist., Seventh Series 5: 56. (Nucras boulengeri, new species). 
Spawls S, Howell K, Hinkel H, Menegon M (2018). Field Guide to East African Reptiles, Second Edition. London: Bloomsbury Natural History. 624 pp. . (Nucras boulengeri, p. 192).

Nucras
Lacertid lizards of Africa
Reptiles described in 1900
Taxa named by Oscar Neumann